Serbian-Emirati relations are foreign relations between Serbia and the United Arab Emirates (UAE).  Serbia, as part of SFR Yugoslavia, established diplomatic relations with the United Arab Emirates in 1971. Serbia also has a commercial section in Dubai. The UAE are represented in Serbia by their embassy in Belgrade.

Emirati investments 

Air Serbia, national flag carrier and largest airline of Serbia: On August 1, 2013, Jat Airways and Etihad Airways entered strategic partnership, and under the agreement, Etihad acquired a 49% stake and management rights for a period of five years, while the Serbian government retain the remaining 51% and hold five of nine monitoring committee seats in the company. Jat Airways was reorganized and renamed to Air Serbia in October 2013 and launched its first inaugural flight under its new name on October 26, 2013, from Belgrade to Abu Dhabi.
The Belgrade Waterfront project includes a 180 m tall skyscraper (the "Belgrade tower") and a big shopping mall to be built along the right side of the Sava river. 2,5 to 2,8 billion € are to be invested by the Serbian government and their Emirati partners.
In March 2014, Serbian financial minister Lazar Krstić announced that the Abu Dhabi Investment Authority has signed a low-interest loan agreement with Serbia worth 1 billion $. In 2013, the UAE have already granted a credit of 400 million $ to Serbia, which had difficulties to allocate European credits for its struggling financial situation. Substantial investments in Serbia's defense-related and semi-conductor industries set stage for large-scale international cooperations between the two countries.

See also 
 Foreign relations of Serbia
 Foreign relations of the United Arab Emirates
 Kosovo–United Arab Emirates relations

References

External links 

 
United Arab Emirates
Bilateral relations of the United Arab Emirates